János Kuszmann (born 3 December 1938), also known as Joe Erwin Kuzman, is a former football defender who played in Hungary, Spain, Turkey, the United States and Greece.

Career
Born in Budapest, Kuszmann started playing football for local side MTK Budapest FC. He would spend most of his career playing abroad, beginning in Austria with Wiener Sport-Club. Next he moved to Spain, where he spent eight seasons playing in La Liga for Real Betis and RCD Espanyol.

In 1967, Kuszmann moved to Turkey, joining Süper Lig side Beşiktaş J.K. He made 21 appearances and scored 8 goals as the club won the league. A brief stint in the United States followed, playing for Philadelphia Spartans and Cleveland Stokers. He returned to Turkey to play for Beşiktaş during the 1968–69 season. The following season, he played in the second division with Boluspor, and then moved to Greece to finish his career with Panachaiki.

References

External links
 Profile at NASL Soccer blog
 
 

1938 births
Living people
Hungarian footballers
MTK Budapest FC players
Wiener Sport-Club players
Real Betis players
RCD Espanyol footballers
Beşiktaş J.K. footballers
Philadelphia Spartans players
Cleveland Stokers players
Boluspor footballers
Panachaiki F.C. players
Expatriate footballers in Turkey
Expatriate footballers in Spain
Association football defenders
Footballers from Budapest